The Río Belgrano Formation is a Barremian to Aptian geologic formation of the Austral Basin in Patagonia, southern Argentina. Among others, pterosaur and ichthyosaur fossils have been recovered from the formation.

Fossil content 
The following fossils have been recovered from the formation:
 Hatchericeras patagonense
 Palaeastacus terraereginae
 Platypterygius hauthali
 Sanmartinoceras africanum
 Tonohamites aequicingulatus
 ?Anhangueridae indet.

See also 
 List of pterosaur-bearing stratigraphic units

References

Bibliography

Further reading 
 M. B. Aguirre Urreta. 1989. The Cretaceous decapod Crustacea of Argentina and the Antarctic Peninsula. Palaeontology 32(3):499-552
 M. B. Aguirre Urreta. 1986. Aptian ammonites from the Argentinian Austral Basin. The Subfamily Helicancylinae Hyatt, 1894. Annals of the South African Museum 96(7):271-314
 J. F. Bonaparte. 1978. El Mesozoico de America de Sur y sus Tetrapodos [The Mesozoic of South America and its tetrapods]. Opera Lilloana 26:1-596

Geologic formations of Argentina
Cretaceous Argentina
Aptian Stage
Barremian Stage
Sandstone formations
Shallow marine deposits
Formations
Fossiliferous stratigraphic units of South America
Paleontology in Argentina
Geology of Santa Cruz Province, Argentina